Aanch is a 2003 Hindi language drama film directed by Rajesh Kumar Singh. Nana Patekar, Paresh Rawal, Suchindra and Sharbani Mukherjee played the lead roles. It's an epic love story set against the background of a crime ridden area of rural Uttar Pradesh. Sanjeev-Darshan scored the music for the movie.

Plot
Mahadev Thakur (Nana Patekar) and Jawahar Pandit (Paresh Rawal) belong to two different villages Mandaur and Amirpur, respectively. They hate each other for reasons best known to them. Diwakar's (Suchindra Bali)'s father (residing in Amirpur) and Vidya's (Sharbani Mukherjee)'s brother Shiva (Deepraj Rana) (a resident of Mandaur) decide to get Diwakar and Vidya married.

The preparations for the marriage ceremony begin, and neither the boy nor the girl knowing what the other looks like. In the meanwhile, the two villages get ready to confront each other in case of a quarrel. The wedding ceremony is underway when the rivalry between the two village heads and the roar of the guns starts. The bride and the groom come separately to the town for studies, oblivious of each other. They are happy to escape the brutal world of rural India to find their own careers and future. They first bump into each other in the train while on their way to the town, then in the college, completely unaware of all facts. For Diwakar, it is love at first sight, but Vidya does not respond to his overtures. Later she packs her bags and heads straight for her village Mandaur. In the meanwhile, Diwakar learns that Vidya is his legally wedded wife, and he decides to get her back from the clutches of two warring villages. It is not easy for them to unite since both village heads, Mahadev and Jawahar, and their coteries object to their uniting due to bitter hatred. They do unite ultimately but after a lot of blood-bath and struggle.

Cast

Soundtrack

References

External links 

2003 films
2000s Hindi-language films
Films scored by Sanjeev Darshan
Indian action drama films
Indian romantic action films
2003 action drama films
2000s romantic action films